USC&GS Marindin was a launch that served as a survey ship in the United States Coast and Geodetic Survey from 1919 to 1944. She was the only Coast and Geodetic Survey ship to bear the name.

Marindin was built by the Canton Lumber Company at Baltimore, Maryland, in 1919.  She entered Coast and Geodetic Survey service that year.

Marindin spent her career on the United States East Coast. She worked as a wire-drag hydrographic survey vessel with the Coast and Geodetic Survey launch USC&GS Ogden.

On 10–11 December 1924, Marindin and the Coast and Geodetic survey launch USC&GS Mitchell aided a United States Marine Corps  motor sailer that had gone aground by pulling it off the rocks and towing it to the U.S. Marine Corps boathouse at St. Thomas in the United States Virgin Islands. On 28 June 1922, she joined the Coast and Geodetic Survey survey ship USC&GS Ranger in searching for survivors of the schooner Rose Standish, which had burned off Morro Point Light, Puerto Rico, although none were found. From 4 to 12 September 1935, she and the Coast and Geodetic Survey launch USC&GS Elsie III helped in relief efforts in the Florida Keys following the passage of the violent 1935 Labor Day hurricane.

Marindin was retired from Coast and Geodetic Survey service in 1944.

References
NOAA History, A Science Odyssey: Tools of the Trade: Ships: Coast and Geodetic Survey Ships: Marindin
NOAA History, A Science Odyssey: Hall of Honor: Lifesaving and the Protection of Property by the Coast & Geodetic Survey 1845-1937

Ships of the United States Coast and Geodetic Survey
Survey ships of the United States
Ships built in Baltimore
1919 ships